WYBX (88.3 FM) is a radio station broadcasting a Conservative Christian format. Licensed to Key West, Florida, United States, the station serves the Florida Keys area. The station is owned by Bible Broadcasting Network, Inc.

History
The station was assigned call sign WAVQ on September 27, 2002. The station changed its call sign to WAZQ on January 26, 2006. On April 9, 2009, the station changed its call sign to the WKZG, and again on June 24, 2012, to the current WYBX.

References

External links

Radio stations established in 2005
Bible Broadcasting Network
2005 establishments in Florida
YBX
Radio stations in Key West, Florida